James Aikman Cochrane  (born 24 June 1888) was a Scottish soldier of the British Army who won the Military Cross and the Belgian Croix de Guerre avec Palme and Croix de Chevalier de l'Ordre de Leopole. With his wife Margarita, he had two children, a daughter Marigold and a son also called James Aikman who Margarita decreed should be known as "Peter" to distinguish him from his father and a cousin. Peter Cochrane himself won a Military Cross during the Second World War in the Western Desert in 1940 and a Distinguished Service Cross in 1941 during the Battle of Keren.

References 

Scottish soldiers
Queen's Own Cameron Highlanders officers
1888 births
Year of death missing
British Army personnel of World War I
Recipients of the Military Cross
Military personnel from Glasgow